The first season of That's So Raven aired on Disney Channel from January 17, 2003 to March 5, 2004. The season introduces the Baxter family, Raven (Raven-Symoné), Cory (Kyle Massey), Tanya Baxter (T'Keyah Crystal Keymáh), and Victor Baxter (Rondell Sheridan) as they manage with Raven and her ability to see into the future. Orlando Brown and Anneliese van der Pol co-stars as Raven's best friends, Eddie Thomas and Chelsea Daniels.

Guest stars for this season included: Rose Abdoo, Angell Conwell, Brian George, Joshua Harto, Amy Hill, Steven Anthony Lawrence, Jenifer Lewis, Wesley Mann, Niecy Nash, Ernie Sabella, Brenda Song, and Kirsten Storms.

Production
The series filmed its pilot episode on April 12, 2001 and was picked up in August. The rest of season was filmed from November 9, 2001 to June 2002. All episodes were filmed at Sunset Gower Studios.

Premise
The show is set in San Francisco and revolves around a 14 year old named Raven Baxter, played by Raven-Symoné, and how she gets herself, her friends Eddie and Chelsea, and her family members, such as her brother Cory, out of various situations, usually by using her psychic powers and a variety of disguises.

Cast
Raven-Symoné as Raven Baxter
Orlando Brown as Eddie Thomas
Kyle Massey as Cory Baxter
Anneliese van der Pol as Chelsea Daniels
T'Keyah Crystal Keymáh as Tanya Baxter
Rondell Sheridan as Victor Baxter

Episodes

 This season consists of 21 episodes. Many episodes were aired out of their intended order and the final three episodes listed here aired after the second season had already premiered.

References

2003 American television seasons
2004 American television seasons
Season 1